The Racha uezd was a county (uezd) of the Kutaisi Governorate of the Caucasus Viceroyalty of the Russian Empire. It bordered the Terek Oblast to the north, the Lechkhumi uezd to the west, the Kutaisi and Shorapani uezds to the south, and the Gori uezd of the Tiflis Governorate to the east. The area of the uezd corresponded to most of the contemporary Racha-Lechkhumi and Kvemo Svaneti region of Georgia. The administrative centre of the Racha uezd was Oni.

History 
The Racha uezd was formed in 1846 as part of the Kutaisi Governorate on the territory of the historical region of Racha during the time of the Russian Empire. In 1918, the Kutaisi Governorate including the Racha uezd was incorporated into the Democratic Republic of Georgia.

Administrative divisions 
The subcounties (uchastoks) of the Racha uezd in 1913 were as follows:

Demographics

Russian Empire Census 
The majority of the population indicated Imeretian to be their mother tongue, with significant Georgian and Ossetian speaking minorities.

Kavkazskiy kalendar 

Notes

References

Bibliography 

Uezds of Kutaisi Governorate